The Cathedral Church of St. John the Baptist is the primary cathedral of the Anglican Diocese of Belize.

Based in Belize City, Belize, and built from 1812 to 1820 with bricks that had been used as ballast aboard ships, it was the first church to be built in the colony of British Honduras.

Initially a parish church, St. John's Church became St. John's Cathedral in 1891, a few years after the Diocese of Belize had been erected. It has numerous alterations dating to more recent renovations.  The exterior of the church is of brick; the interior is fitted out in mahogany and sapodilla.

It is a historical landmark of Belize from the colonial influence of the country's past. Attached to the church is the oldest cemetery in the country, Yarborough Cemetery.
It was built by the British using slave labour.

External links

St. John's Cathedral

Churches completed in 1812
19th-century Anglican church buildings
Cathedrals in Belize
Buildings and structures in Belize City